Popanomyia is a genus of flies in the family Stratiomyidae.

Species
Popanomyia femoralis Kertész, 1909
Popanomyia kerteszi James & Woodley, 1980

References

Stratiomyidae
Brachycera genera
Taxa named by Kálmán Kertész
Diptera of South America